Highway 964 was a provincial highway in the Canadian province of Saskatchewan. It ran from Black Lake to Stony Rapids.

In the late 1990s, a winter road was constructed from Black Lake to Points North Landing, it was designated as being part of Highway 905; Highway 964 was absorbed and redesignated as Highway 905.

See also
Roads in Saskatchewan
Transportation in Saskatchewan

References

964